The Bratislava International School of Liberal Arts (BISLA), located in the Old Town of Bratislava, Slovakia, is the first liberal arts college in Central Europe. A private, accredited three-year degree-granting undergraduate institution, it opened in September 2006.

External links
 Official English website

Education in Bratislava
Universities and colleges in Slovakia
Liberal arts colleges
Educational institutions established in 2006
Buildings and structures in Bratislava
2006 establishments in Slovakia